In complex analysis, a branch of mathematics, the Thom–Sebastiani Theorem states: given the germ  defined as  where  are germs of holomorphic functions with isolated singularities, the vanishing cycle complex of  is isomorphic to the tensor product of those of .  Moreover, the isomorphism respects the  monodromy operators in the sense: .

The theorem was introduced by Thom and Sebastiani in 1971.

Observing that the analog fails in positive characteristic, Deligne suggested that, in positive characteristic, a tensor product should be replaced by a (certain) local convolution product.

References 

Theorems in complex analysis